This is a list of yearly South Atlantic Conference football standings.

South Atlantic standings

References

Standings
South Atlantic Conference
College football-related lists